Singing in the Shrouds is a detective novel by New Zealand writer Ngaio Marsh; it is the twentieth novel to feature Roderick Alleyn, and was first published in 1959.  The plot concerns a serial killer who is on a voyage from London to South Africa.

Background
New Zealand born Ngaio Marsh divided most of her adult life between her home on the outskirts of Christchurch (NZ) and frequent visits to England (mostly London), where she had many friends, although she also travelled in France and Italy (where two of her novels are set), and to the USA and Japan. Some of her English visits were of considerable length. Most of her novels are set in either England or New Zealand, draw upon her own life experiences, and in some cases upon an identifiable initial idea taken from a true crime. Both apply to Singing in the Shrouds, based on the long sea voyages between New Zealand and Europe or the USA she preferred to flying (when air travel became more usual). She would always choose a small (cargo) ship with only a limited number of passengers, rather than one of the big passenger liners, and she undertook careful research in writing this novel about the cargo ship Cape Farewell 's voyage from London to South Africa with capacity for only 9 passengers. Marsh biographer Joanne Drayton relates how the writer based the novel's Cape Farewell on a lengthy 1954 sea voyage she took aboard the Norwegian ship Temeraire, with a cargo of wool and 10 passengers, from Adelaide to Odessa, then via Spain to its ultimate docking in Wales. As Drayton comments: 'The people on board and the ship itself became the material for Singing in the Shrouds '.

In writing a rare Roderick Alleyn mystery about a psychopathic serial killer, Marsh also researched this aspect, two actual wartime cases clearly providing reference points for her plot - those of Gordon Cummins (London's 'Blackout Ripper') and Eddie Leonski (Melbourne's 'Brownout Killer'). The latter case shares significant common features with Marsh's fictional strangler, who 'says it with flowers' and sings as he kills or just after killing his victims: Leonski is recorded as having explained of the women he strangled that he wanted "to get at their voices".

Plot synopsis
Shortly before the midnight sailing of the cargo ship Cape Farewell from the Pool of London, bound for Cape Town, with its crew and full complement of 9 assorted passengers, the body of a strangled woman is discovered on the fog-wreathed dock, clearly the third victim of a serial killer who scatters flowers and broken beads on his victims and sings as he departs. The body is clutching part of a torn embarkation notice for the Cape Farewell, so it seems 'The Flower Killer' must be one of the passengers. Scotland Yard Superintendent Roderick Alleyn boards by pilot off Portsmouth and poses as a passenger with the aim of identifying the culprit and preventing another murder on voyage, despite the grudging co-operation of the ship's Captain Bannerman, whose obstruction and denial of the situation enables a further killing to take place on voyage.

The passengers are a very mixed collection - a glamorous socialite widow, a sweet young girl who's been jilted at the altar, a deeply unhappy middle-aged spinster with a specialism in church music, an Anglo-Catholic priest, a pedantically tetchy school-teacher, an alcoholic TV presenter on the edge of a nervous breakdown, a charmlessly smug middle-aged couple and an eccentric elderly bachelor. The cast of suspects is completed by the crusty captain, the very camp steward and the ship's young doctor. As the ship cruises into the tropics, the temperature rises, tensions emerge and events lead relentlessly towards another murder, as the ship's passengers gradually recognise, with horror, that the Flower Killer is on board and due to strike again. Eventually, this happens, despite Roderick Alleyn's best efforts to prevent it, but the killer is identified and apprehended as the ship reaches Cape Town.

Adaptation 
The novel was adapted for the stage in 1963 as Murder Sails at Midnight, and staged in 1972 in England.

References

Roderick Alleyn novels
1959 British novels
Collins Crime Club books
Novels set on ships
Novels set in South Africa
Novels set in London
Novels set in Spain
British detective novels
British mystery novels
British crime novels
English-language novels